Lucayan National Park is a national park in Grand Bahama, the Bahamas.

Flora and fauna
Prior to the creation of the park, the area was the site of the discovery of the Remipedia class of crustaceans, in the late 1970s. The park is also an Important Bird Area, providing habitat for the thick-billed vireo, Bahama swallow and the olive-capped warbler, among others.

References

National parks of the Bahamas
Grand Bahama